Olivier Beretta (born 23 November 1969) is a professional racing driver from Monaco who raced in Formula One in 1994 for the Larrousse team, partnering Érik Comas. He participated in 10 Grands Prix, debuting on 27 March 1994. He scored no championship points, and was replaced when his sponsorship money ran out. During 2003 and 2004, he tested for the Williams team.

Career
Born in Monte Carlo, Beretta has seen more success in sportscar racing, taking class wins at the 24 Heures du Mans with Viper GTS-Rs in 1999 (10th overall) and 2000 (7th overall), Corvettes in 2004 (C5-R, 6th overall), 2005 (C5-R, 5th overall) and 2006 (C6-R, 4th overall) and driving LMP900 class cars to 6th (2001), 4th (2002) and 3rd (2003) place class finishes.

He made a single NASCAR Craftsman Truck Series start at Heartland Park Topeka in 1999 for Bobby Hamilton Racing, qualifying 10th and finishing 17th.

For 2012, Beretta made the move from Corvette to Ferrari and started the season at the 2012 24 Hours of Daytona with Risi Competizione's Ferrari F458 Italia Grand Am. He competed in the FIA World Endurance Championship in a GTE-Pro class Ferrari F458 Italia for AF Corse.

Racing record

Complete International Formula 3000 results
(key) (Races in bold indicate pole position) (Races
in italics indicate fastest lap)

Complete Formula One results
(key)

Complete 24 Hours of Le Mans results

Complete FIA GT Championship results
(key) (Races in bold indicate pole position) (Races in italics indicate fastest lap)

Complete European Le Mans Series results
(key) (Races in bold indicate pole position; races in italics indicate fastest lap)

NASCAR
(key) (Bold – Pole position awarded by qualifying time. Italics – Pole position earned by points standings or practice time. * – Most laps led.)

Craftsman Truck Series

Complete FIA World Endurance Championship results
(key) (Races in bold indicate pole position; races in italics indicate fastest lap)

Complete WeatherTech SportsCar Championship results
(key) (Races in bold indicate pole position) (Races in italics indicate fastest lap)

References

External links

 
 Profile on F1 Rejects

Monegasque people of Italian descent
Monegasque racing drivers
Monegasque Formula One drivers
Larrousse Formula One drivers
1969 births
Living people
NASCAR drivers
American Le Mans Series drivers
24 Hours of Le Mans drivers
International Formula 3000 drivers
24 Hours of Daytona drivers
European Le Mans Series drivers
Rolex Sports Car Series drivers
FIA World Endurance Championship drivers
WeatherTech SportsCar Championship drivers
24 Hours of Spa drivers
Oreca drivers
Corvette Racing drivers
SMP Racing drivers
AF Corse drivers
Larbre Compétition drivers
Ferrari Competizioni GT drivers
People from Monte Carlo